George Kasangaki is an Anglican bishop in Uganda; he has been Bishop of Masindi-Kitara since 2012.

Kasingi was educated at the University of Gloucestershire and Uganda Christian University. He has served the church as a parish priest; a Chaplain; a Field Worker with LIFE Ministry, and as Diocesan Secretary of Bunyoro-Kitara Diocese then Masindi-Kitara Diocese.

References

Anglican bishops of Masindi-Kitara
21st-century Anglican bishops in Uganda
Alumni of the University of Gloucestershire
Uganda Christian University alumni
Living people
Year of birth missing (living people)